The Hanthana Mountain Range lies in the central highlands of Sri Lanka, south-west of Kandy. It was declared as an environmental protection area in February 2010 under the National Environment Act. The mountain range consists of seven peaks. The highest one being the Uura Kanda. The range is a favourite destination among the mountain hikers in Sri Lanka. University of Peradeniya is situated adjacent to the Hanthana mountain range.

Gallery

References

External links
Heavenly High at Hanthana 

Mountain ranges of Sri Lanka
Landforms of Central Province, Sri Lanka
Tourist attractions in Central Province, Sri Lanka